Nipuna Gamage (born 21 December 1995) is a Sri Lankan cricketer. He made his List A debut for Polonnaruwa District in the 2016–17 Districts One Day Tournament on 18 March 2017. He made his Twenty20 debut for Kalutara Town Club in the 2017–18 SLC Twenty20 Tournament on 25 February 2018.

References

External links
 

1995 births
Living people
Sri Lankan cricketers
Bloomfield Cricket and Athletic Club cricketers
Kalutara Town Club cricketers
Polonnaruwa District cricketers
People from Sri Jayawardenepura Kotte